The Game Award for Game of the Year is an award presented annually by The Game Awards. It is given to a video game judged to deliver the best experience across creative and technical fields. The award is traditionally accepted by the game's directors or studio executives. The process begins with over 100 video game publications and websites, which collectively name six games as nominees. After the nominees are selected, the winner is chosen by a combined vote between the jury (90 percent) and public voting (10 percent).

Since its inception, the award has been given to nine video games. Publishers Electronic Arts and Sony Interactive Entertainment have won the award twice, the latter being nominated a record eleven times, while FromSoftware is the only developer with more than one win. Bethesda Softworks is the most nominated company without a win at four. The most recent winner is Elden Ring, developed by FromSoftware and published by Bandai Namco Entertainment.

Process and history 

The Game Awards has a voting jury consisting of over 100 video game media and influencer outlets, which have been specifically selected for their work in critically evaluating video games. Each outlet completes an unranked ballot listing its top five choices; games with the most appearances across the ballots are selected as the nominees. The winners are determined between the jury (90 percent) and public voting (10 percent). The public vote is held via the official website and social media platforms; in 2022, The Game Awards partnered with Discord for social media voting, though previous ceremonies have used platforms like Facebook and Twitter. Any game released before a certain date in November prior to the ceremony is eligible for award consideration. As a result, any game released after the cutoff date is eligible in the following year's ceremony, such as 2018's Super Smash Bros. Ultimate nominations at The Game Awards 2019; similarly, games released between the ballot due date in early November and the cutoff date in mid-to-late November are often overlooked, such as Star Wars Jedi: Fallen Order in both 2019 and 2020 and Demon's Souls and Marvel's Spider-Man: Miles Morales in 2020. Early access games available before the cutoff date are eligible, as are live service games regardless of their release year: 2018's Among Us received several nominations in 2020.

The Game Award for Game of the Year is given to a video game judged to deliver the best experience across creative and technical fields. It is presented as the final award of the ceremony and is widely considered its most prestigious honor. The category was expanded from five to six nominees in 2018. The award is traditionally accepted by the director of the winning game or an executive from the studio; the first award in 2014 was accepted by Dragon Age: Inquisition executive producer Mark Darrah and BioWare general manager Aaryn Flynn. The Game Awards host and producer Geoff Keighley presented the award for the first four ceremonies. Other presenters include directors of past winners—such as 2016 winner Overwatchs lead director Jeff Kaplan in 2018, 2020 winner The Last of Us Part IIs creative director Neil Druckmann in 2021, and 2021 winner It Takes Twos director Josef Fares in 2022—and celebrity guests like Vin Diesel and Michelle Rodriguez in 2019 and Christopher Nolan in 2020.

Winners and nominees 

Companies with multiple nominations and awards

Notes

References

Awards for best video game
The Game Awards
Awards established in 2014